Kentucky Route 587 (KY 587) is a  state highway that travels from U.S. Route 421 (US 421) and Jackson County High School Road west of Smith to KY 11 southwest of Congleton via Smith, New Zion, Arvel, Delvinta, and Ida May.

Major intersections

References

0587
Transportation in Jackson County, Kentucky
Transportation in Lee County, Kentucky